Three ships of the Royal Navy have borne the name HMS Scimitar, after the scimitar, a curved sword:

  was an  launched in 1918 and sold in 1947.
  was a Scimitar-class fast training boat launched in 1969 and sold in 1983.
She entered service in 1993, was transferred to the Royal Navy in 2002 and renamed Scimitar, and as of 9 March 2022 is decommissioned, no longer in service and up for disposal.

Battle honours
Ships named Scimitar have earned the following battle honours:
 Dunkirk 1940
 Atlantic 1940-42, 1944
 Arctic 1942
 English Channel 1943-44

Royal Navy ship names